Stanley Ebuka Nzediegwu (born 15 May 1989) known professionally as Stan Nze is a Nigerian actor known for his role in the 2020 remake of Amaka Igwe's Rattlesnake. Stan won the 2022 AMVCA Award under the 'Best Actor in Drama' category for his role played in Rattlesnake.

 Biography 
Stan Nze was born on 15 May 1989 in  Lagos, Nigeria, to a businessman father and fashion designer mother as the first of five children. He obtained a bachelor's degree in computer science from Nnamdi Azikiwe University in Awka. He also had training in acting at the Stella Damasus Arts Foundation.

He made his acting debut in a 2009 TV series named Private Sector and his first major film role was in a 2013 movie named Murder At Prime Suites'' where he played the role of a serial killer with bipolar affective disorder.

He married actress, Blessing Jessica Obasi on Saturday 11 September 2021 in Lagos.

Filmography

Films

TV Shows

Awards and nominations

References

External links 

1989 births
Living people
Nnamdi Azikiwe University alumni
21st-century Nigerian male actors
Nigerian male film actors
Igbo actors
Africa Magic Viewers' Choice Awards winners